Hărău is a commune in Hunedoara County, Transylvania, Romania. It is composed of four villages: Banpotoc (Bánpatak), Bârsău (Berekszó), Chimindia (Kéménd) and Hărău.

References

Communes in Hunedoara County
Localities in Transylvania